This list of presidents of the University of Central Florida includes all who have served as university presidents of the University of Central Florida since its founding in 1963. The University of Central Florida is a space-grant university located on a  campus in Orlando, Florida. UCF is a member institution of the State University System of Florida and is the second-largest university in the United States. Although the institution was founded in 1963, the name officially changed to the University of Central Florida in 1978 from Florida Technological University.

The first president of the university was Charles Millican, who was appointed by the Board of Regents to create a new university in Central Florida. Realizing his goal when the first classes were held at FTU in the Fall of 1968, Millican would be followed by Trevor Colbourn and Steven Altman. The fourth president was John C. Hitt, who served from March 1, 1992, to June 30, 2018, the longest tenure of a UCF president. The fifth president was Dale Whittaker, formerly the university's provost and executive vice president. He resigned in February 2019, following an investigation regarding UCF's misuse of funds. The current president, Alexander Cartwright, became acting president on April 13, 2020. Cartwright previously served as chancellor of the University of Missouri.

Powers and duties

The president of the University of Central Florida is the chief executive officer of the university. The university's Board of Trustees nominates the president, who must then be confirmed by the Florida Board of Governors. There is no limit set on how long a president may serve in office.

The president is responsible for the everyday operations of the university, as well as budget and program administration. They are responsible for consulting with the Board of Trustees, for setting the university's goals and mission, fiduciary policy and for creating appropriate committees and nominating deans and other executive officers of the university. In addition to serving as UCF's key spokesperson, the president is responsible for ultimately executing the rules and policies of the Board of
Governors and Board of Trustees. The president reports to the chair of the board of trustees.

Though the University of Central Florida Athletic Association functions independently from the university, the president serves as the Chairman of the Athletics Association board, and appoints the majority of the board members. In addition, the president has the right to dissolve the Athletic Association as an independent entity at any time and bring it back under control of the UCF Board of Trustees.

The president's official office is located in Millican Hall on the university's main campus, and the president has the privilege of living in the Burnett House, also located on UCF's main campus in Orlando.

List of presidents

Timeline of presidential terms

See also
 University of Central Florida
 State University System of Florida
 List of University of Central Florida alumni
 List of University of Central Florida faculty and administrators

References
General:
 Holic, Nathan, and the UCF Alumni Association. University of Central Florida: The Campus History Series (2009), 

In-text:

External links
 Official Website
 Office of the President

University of Central Florida-related lists

Central Florida